Schive is both a given name and a surname. Notable people with the name include:

Jakob Schive (1897–1969), Norwegian military officer, geodesist, and Milorg pioneer
Jens Schive (1900–1962), Norwegian journalist and diplomat
Schive Chi (born 1947), Taiwanese politician